Mark Rowell (born 9 September 1973) is an English former cricketer. He was a right-handed batsman and a right-arm medium-pace bowler who played for Oxfordshire. He was born in Carlisle.

Rowell, who made a single appearance in both the Minor Counties Championship and the Minor Counties Trophy in 2002, made a single List A appearance in the same year, against Lancashire CB. From the lower order, he scored 5 runs.

Rowell bowled 5 overs in the match, taking figures of 2-26.

Mark Eugene Rowell (born 13 March 1963) is an American citizen. Born in Hot Springs, Arkansas where he grew up poor. Lived with his grandmother until 6th grade when he was placed into a Christian based children's home.  Ran away at 13. He attended school where he was an 'A' student but had to drop out in order to work and support himself.  When he was 16 he hitchhiked across the southern route of the U.S. to California then up to Washington state.  He negotiated a job with a construction company in Bakersfield, CA. He operated heavy equipment and drove an 18 wheeler locally hauling 40' cotton bales from the fields to the plant.

References

External links
Mark Rowell at CricketArchive 

1973 births
Living people
English cricketers
Oxfordshire cricketers